Eucalyptus websteriana, commonly known as Webster's mallee, heart-leaf mallee or dainty mallee, is a species of mallee that is endemic to the Goldfields-Esperance region of Western Australia. It has reddish minnirichi bark on the trunk and branches, egg-shaped to heart-shaped adult leaves, flower buds in groups of seven, pale cream-coloured to yellow flowers and usually hemispherical fruit.

Description
It has reddish brown minnirichi bark on the trunk and branches. The adult leaves have a distinctive heart shape and the tree has a compact crown, providing lightly dappled shade that benefits plants in the undergrowth. Flowering occurs from July to November and the flowers are pale cream-coloured to yellow.

Taxonomy and naming
Eucalyptus websteriana was first formally described in 1916 by Joseph Maiden in the Journal and Proceedings of the Royal Society of New South Wales from specimens collected by Leonard Clarke Webster, a pharmacist and doctor who lived in Kalgoorlie and sold botanical specimens to the British Museum of Natural History. The specific epithet honours the collector of the type specimens.

This mallee resembles E. orbifolia, with both having a similar leaf-shape, and it is also closely related to E. ewartiana and E. crucis.

Distribution
This mallee is found on rocky rises in the Goldfields-Esperance region of Western Australia in an area centred around Kalgoorlie. Its range extends to the western fringe of the Great Victoria Desert to the east of Cosmo Newberry down to around Kambalda and Norseman in the south west where it grows in rocky soils.

Conservation status
This eucalypt is classified as "not threatened" by the Government of Western Australia Department of Parks and Wildlife.

See also
List of Eucalyptus species

References

websteriana
Endemic flora of Western Australia
Mallees (habit)
Myrtales of Australia
Eucalypts of Western Australia
Plants described in 1916
Taxa named by Joseph Maiden